Cowman may refer to:
Cowman (profession)
Cowman (surname)
Cowboy
Ken Shirk or Cowman, an American ultramarathon runner 
Cowman Publishing Company, publisher of books by Richard C. Halverson
Cowman, a sept of Clan Cumming
Cowman, Otis the Cow's alter ego in Back at the Barnyard

See also
"Farmer Bill's Cowman", a song by The Wurzels
"Daniel Cowman", a song by Regina Spektor from Songs
Reed Anthony, Cowman: An Autobiography, a 1907 book by Andy Adams
Stockman (Australia), a person who looks after livestock on a station